Graham Land is the portion of the Antarctic Peninsula that lies north of a line joining Cape Jeremy and Cape Agassiz. This description of Graham Land is consistent with the 1964 agreement between the British Antarctic Place-names Committee and the US Advisory Committee on Antarctic Names, in which the name "Antarctic Peninsula" was approved for the major peninsula of Antarctica, and the names Graham Land and Palmer Land for the northern and southern portions, respectively.  The line dividing them is roughly 69 degrees south.

Graham Land is named after Sir James R. G. Graham, First Lord of the Admiralty at the time of John Biscoe's exploration of the west side of Graham Land in 1832. It is claimed by Argentina (as part of Argentine Antarctica), Britain (as part of the British Antarctic Territory) and Chile (as part of the Chilean Antarctic Territory).

Graham Land is the closest part of Antarctica to South America. Thus it is the usual destination for small ships taking paying visitors on Antarctic trips from South America.  (Larger ships are not allowed to disembark passengers.)

Until the discoveries of the British Graham Land Expedition of 1934–1937, it was generally supposed to be an archipelago rather than a peninsula. The mountains of Graham Land are the last range of the American Cordillera, the almost continuous sequence of mountain ranges forming the western "backbone" of North America, Central America, South America and the Antarctic Peninsula.

Argentina calls the area Tierra de San Martín (Land of Saint Martin) and also calls the northern peninsula (Trinity Peninsula) Península Trinidad or Tierra de la Trinidad. Similarly, Chile calls the entire Antarctic Peninsula Tierra de O'Higgins (Land of O'Higgins).

Features

Peaks
 The Downfall, located between the heads of Arago Glacier and Woodbury Glacier.

Plateaus
The interior of Graham Land is occupied by a series of plateaus, namely (north to south) Laclavère Plateau, Louis Philippe Plateau, Detroit Plateau, Herbert Plateau, Foster Plateau, Forbidden Plateau, Bruce Plateau, Avery Plateau and Hemimont Plateau.

See also

References

Further reading
 
Antarctic Digital Database (ADD). Scale 1:250000 topographic map of Antarctica. Scientific Committee on Antarctic Research (SCAR). Since 1993, regularly upgraded and updated.

External links
 

 
British Antarctic Territory
Lands of Antarctica